Pope Avilius of Alexandria (also known as Abilius, Sabellius, Abylius, Abitius, Milius and Melyos) (? – 95 AD), was the 3rd Patriarch of Alexandria.

Overview
Upon the death of Anianus of Alexandria, the suffragan bishops and priests of the area converged with the laity in Alexandria and unanimously elected Avilius in the month of December (Kiahk), 83 AD, during the reign of the Roman Emperor Domitian.

Pope Avilius was known for his chastity, and was pious and caring towards the people of Christ. He continued to establish the people in faith and the Christians grew in number in Egypt and in the five western provinces, and Sudan. During his time serving, the Egyptian people began renouncing the worshiping of idols and practiced their Christianity together, in groups. Despite the religion of Egypt being Roman Paganism, his time as pope was a time of peace for the church. 

While some historians claim that Emperor Domitian expelled Avilius from the episcopal throne, and installed another in his place, there is no written record of this. According to historical records, he remained in his position for twelve years, and died on the first of Thout (11 September), in the year 95. Avilius was buried next to the remains of St. Mark the Evangelist in the Church of Baucalis in Alexandria.

Veneration
He is venerated as a saint in various churches. His feast day in the Coptic Church is on The Coptic New Year 1 Thout, which is September 11 in the Gregorian Calendar, and on 29 August and 29 March in the Catholic Church, and February 22 in Eastern Orthodox Church.

References

External links 
 Coptic Documents in French

Further reading
Holweck, F. G., A Biographical Dictionary of the Saints. St. Louis, MO: B. Herder Book Co. 1924.
Atiya, Aziz S. The Coptic Encyclopedia. New York: Macmillan Publishing Co., 1991. 

95 deaths
1st-century Popes and Patriarchs of Alexandria
1st-century Christian saints
Burials at Saint Mark's Coptic Orthodox Cathedral (Alexandria)
Saints from Roman Egypt
Year of birth unknown